Emmanuel Adjetey (born December 15, 1988) is a Ghanaian footballer who last played for Charleston Battery of USL Pro. Adjetey plays as a left back and left winger, and is also a free kick specialist.

Career 
Adjetey began his career by Prestea Mine Stars, before in 2005 joined to Ashanti Gold SC. In January 2008 debuted for Ashanti Gold S.C. first team.

In 2013, Adjetey was invited to join the development squad of the Vancouver Whitecaps of Major League Soccer. Adjetey was loaned to USL club Charleston Battery in 2013 and signed with Charleston permanently the following year.

Adjetey is not retired.

International career
He was member of Ghana U-17 team 2005.

References

1988 births
Living people
Ghanaian footballers
Ashanti Gold SC players
Ghanaian expatriate footballers
Vancouver Whitecaps FC U-23 players
Charleston Battery players
Association football midfielders
USL Championship players
Expatriate soccer players in the United States
Ghanaian expatriate sportspeople in the United States